Encephalitis vaccine may refer to:
 Tick-borne encephalitis vaccine
 Japanese encephalitis vaccine